The 1984 NAIA women's basketball tournament was the fourth annual tournament held by the NAIA to determine the national champion of women's college basketball among its members in the United States and Canada.

UNC Asheville defeated Portland in the championship game, 72–70 after one overtime period, to claim the Bulldogs' first NAIA national title. 

The tournament was played in Cedar Rapids, Iowa.

Qualification

The tournament field expanded for the first time since its establishment, increasing from eight to sixteen teams. The top eight teams were seeded.  

The tournament utilized a simple single-elimination format, with an additional third-place game for the two teams that lost in the semifinals.

Bracket

See also
1984 NCAA Division I women's basketball tournament
1984 NCAA Division II women's basketball tournament
1984 NCAA Division III women's basketball tournament
1984 NAIA men's basketball tournament

References

NAIA
NAIA Women's Basketball Championships
Tournament
1984 in sports in Iowa